Boston Bypass could refer to:

Boston Bypass Independents, a political party in the United Kingdom
A proposal by Vincent Zarrilli for road infrastructure around Boston